Abeyie is a surname. Notable people with the surname include:

 Quincy Owusu-Abeyie (born 1986), Ghanaian footballer and rapper
 Tim Abeyie (born 1982), British-born Ghanaian sprinter

Surnames of Akan origin